The 2016–17 First Women's Basketball League of Serbia is the 11th season of the First Women's Basketball League of Serbia, the highest professional basketball league in Serbia. It is also 73rd national championship played by Serbian clubs inclusive of nation's previous incarnations as Yugoslavia and Serbia and Montenegro.

The first half of the season consists of 12 teams and 132-game regular season (22 games for each of the 12 teams).

21 December 2016, Vojvodina NS is expelled from the league on the basis of the regulations of the Federation because it is not organized two matches in a row as the host, and according to the same rules will be transferred to the two lower competition.

Team information

Regular season
The League of the season was played with 12 teams and play a dual circuit system, each with each one game at home and away. The four best teams at the end of the regular season were placed in the Play Off. The regular season began on 8 October 2016 and it will end on 8 March 2017.

Standings

Results

Play Off

Semifinals
Game 1

Game 2

Final
Game 1

Game 2

Game 3

Game 4

Bracket

Awards
Finals MVP: Mina Đorđević (186-PF-99) of Crvena zvezda
Player of the Year: Bojana Stevanović (180-F/C-96) of Radivoj Korać
Guard of the Year: Aleksandra Katanić (172-PG-97) of Crvena zvezda
Forward of the Year: Mina Đorđević (186-PF-99) of Crvena zvezda
Center of the Year: Bojana Stevanović (180-F/C-96) of Radivoj Korać
Defensive player of the year: Bojana Stevanović (180-F/C-96) of Radivoj Korać
Most Improved Player of the Year: Teodora Turudić (178-F-99) of Radivoj Korać
Coach of the Year: Dragan Vuković of Crvena zvezda

1st Team
PG: Aleksandra Katanić (172-PG-97) of Crvena zvezda
PF: Mina Đorđević (186-PF-99) of Crvena zvezda
PF: Suzana Milovanović (185-PF-79) of Partizan 1953
PF: Zorica Mitov (188-PF-87) of Vršac
F/C: Bojana Stevanović (180-F/C-96) of Radivoj Korać

2nd Team
SG: Snežana Bogićević (177-SG-97) of Crvena zvezda
F: Teodora Turudić (178-F-99) (178-F-99) of Radivoj Korać
F: Marina Mandić (182-F-83) of Vršac
F/C: Nataša Mijatović (191-F/C-89) of Vrbas Medela
C/F: Ivanka Matić (193-C/F-79) of Tarbes Basket

3rd Team
G: Rada Vidović (177-G-79) of Partizan 1953
G: Jelena Trifunović (G-92) of Šumadija Kragujevac
F: Kristina Milošević (177-F-90) of Šumadija Kragujevac
F: Anđelina Radić (187-F-94) of Kraljevo
F/C: Tamara Jokić (182-F/C-96) of Šabac

Honorable Mention
Tijana Jelić (189-F/C-99) of Radivoj Korać
Anja Spasojević (180-SG-96) of Radivoj Korać
Ivana Katanić (174-PG-99) of Crvena zvezda
Milina Mišeljić (186-PF-98) of Crvena zvezda
Marija Prlja (163-PG-87) of Crvena zvezda
Ivana Šerić (170-G-88) of Kraljevo
Miljana Džombeta (169-PG-94) of Vrbas Medela
Jelena Nikpaljević (175-G-94) of Vrbas Medela
Olga Stepanović (178-SG-94) of Partizan 1953
Nataša Pavlov (179-F/C-93) of Spartak Subotica
Sofija Lazareska (175-G/F-95) of Šumadija Kragujevac
Jovana Jeremić (95) of Student Niš
Dragana Nikolić (189-PF-95) of Student Niš
Anastasija Podunavac (184-C-97) of Novosadska ŽKA
Marijana Čorto (182-F-94) of Vojvodina NS

References

External links
Official website
First Women's Basketball League of Serbia at eurobasket.com
First Women's Basketball League of Serbia at srbijasport.net

First Women's Basketball League of Serbia seasons
Serbia
women